The Yiddishers were a London street gang based in Whitechapel and were led by Alfred Solomon. One of their more famous members was future mobster Jack Spot during the inter-war years. During the 1930s, they opposed the growing fascist movement in Great Britain and participated in an attack on members of the British Union of Fascists led by Sir Oswald Mosley, later known as the Battle of Cable Street on 4 October 1936.

Other gangs in London around the same period as the Yiddishers were the Jewish Aldgate Mob, Russian Jews Bessarabian Tigers, Bethnal Green Mob who were allies with the Hoxton Mob, Camden Town's Broad Mob, Elephant and Castle Mob, Islington Mob, Kings Cross Gang, Odessians, West End Boys and the Whitechapel Mob.

The leader of the Yiddishers, Alfred Solomon, was inspiration for the fiction Peaky Blinders character, Alfie Solomons, played by Tom Hardy.

References

Anti-fascism in the United Kingdom
Anti-racism in the United Kingdom
Former gangs in London
English Jews
Jews and Judaism in London
Opposition to antisemitism in the United Kingdom
Yiddish culture in England
Jewish organisations based in the United Kingdom
Jewish anti-fascists